Hydra the Revenge (sometimes simply shortened to Hydra) is a steel Floorless Coaster at Dorney Park & Wildwater Kingdom in Allentown, Pennsylvania. It is the only floorless roller coaster in Pennsylvania and was opened on May 7, 2005. Hydra was built on the site of the former wooden roller coaster Hercules, which was closed and demolished at the end of the park's 2003 season. Its name comes from the Greek Mythology story where Hercules battled the Hydra.

History
On September 3, 2003, Dorney Park announced that Hercules would not reopen for the 2004 season. The ride operated for the last time on Labor Day and site preparation began shortly afterwards. On September 14, 2004, the $13 million Hydra the Revenge was announced. Construction began in the spring of 2004 and continued through the winter. Hydra the Revenge was topped off (highest piece of the lift hill) on August 20, 2004 and the entire track layout was completed on December 4, 2004. The first cars for the coaster arrived at Dorney Park on December 10, 2004 and the first ride with people on a train took place on March 24, 2005. The roller coaster officially opened to the public on May 7, 2005.

Backstory
The name of the roller coaster comes from the story of Hercules in Greek Mythology. According to the story, Hercules had to perform twelve labours. After defeating the Nemean lion for the first labour, the second was to defeat the Hydra, a nine-headed creature with eight serpentine heads that would regrow each time they were cut off, including one that was immortal. Dorney Park altered the remainder of the story — after Hercules managed to defeat the Hydra initially, he could not kill the immortal head, so he instead buried it deep underground and beneath a giant stone, with the intention of sealing it for all time. Many years later however, the head slowly grew back the rest of its body, resurrecting the Hydra and taking its revenge on Hercules by killing him; hence why the Hydra roller coaster sits where Hercules once did.

Ride experience

Once the floor drops and the front gate opens, the train is dispatched leading straight into the first inversion; a heartline roll, nicknamed the "Jojo Roll". Upon exiting the roll, the train makes a 180 degree right turn and begins to climb the  lift hill. Once at the top, the train drops down  at a 68 degree angle. Then, the train makes a slight right turn into a  inclined dive loop before going through a zero-gravity roll. Next, immediately after the roll, the train enters the first of two corkscrews. After exiting the corkscrew, the train then goes through a cobra roll. After an upward left turn, followed by a downward right turn, the train goes over an airtime hill before entering the second corkscrew. The train then makes a 360 degree left turn, followed by a banked 90-degree right turn which leads into the final brake run and back into the station. One cycle of the ride lasts about 2 minutes and 35 seconds.

Characteristics

Trains
Hydra the Revenge operates with two steel and fiberglass trains. Each train has eight cars that can seat four riders in a single row for a total of 32 riders per train. Each train has two shades of green and pink on the bottom section while the seats and over-the-shoulder restraints are also pink. Each seat has an over-the-shoulder harness with an interlocking seatbelt. The trains have no floor as the riders' legs can dangle above the track.

Track
It was manufactured by Clermont Steel Fabricators located in Batavia, Ohio. The track has two shades of green while the supports are turquoise.

Reception
Jeremy Thompson from Roller Coaster Philosophy said that "the ride itself is okay, but I’m not sure if I really loved the whole experience.", but that "still, it’s got a more interesting layout." A group of roller coaster enthusiasts also came to the conclusion that the ride wasn't the best but still good, "The general consensus is that it's a good, but not quite great, ride that's perfect for family-oriented Dorney."

References

External links

 Hydra the Revenge's official page 

Classical mythology in popular culture
Roller coasters introduced in 2005
Roller coasters operated by Cedar Fair
Roller coasters in Pennsylvania
Floorless Coaster roller coasters manufactured by Bolliger & Mabillard